Carlota "Lota" C. Delgado-de la Rosa (19 May 1921 – 28 April 2009) was a Filipino actress noted mostly for her pre-World War II career. She was born in Iloilo City.

She largely stopped acting after marrying fellow actor and future Senator Rogelio dela Rosa.

She died on 28 April 2009 in Manila, Philippines.

Filmography
 Takip-Silim (Sampaguita, 1939)
 Gunita  (Sampaguita, 1940)
 Katarungan (Sampaguita, 1940)
 Estrellita (Sampaguita, 1940)
 Colegiala (Sampaguita, 1940)
 Nang Mahawi ang Ulap (Sampaguita, 1940)
 Tarhata (Sampaguita, 1941)
 Irisan (RDR, 1952)

External links

References 

1921 births
2009 deaths
Filipino film actresses